Gagliano is an Italian surname. Notable people with the surname include:

Tony Gagliano (born 1958) Canadian businessman and philanthropist
Alessandro Gagliano (c. 1700–1735), Italian luthier
Alfonso Gagliano (1942–2020), Canadian accountant and politician
Bob Gagliano (born 1958), former American Football player
Fernando Gagliano (c. 1770–1795), Italian luthier
Gaetano Gagliano (1917–2016), Italian-Canadian businessman
Januarius Gagliano (c. 1740–1780), Italian luthier
Leonardo Gagliano (20th century), Brazilian radio speaker and sports commentator
Marco da Gagliano (1582–1643), Italian composer
Nicolò Gagliano (c. 1740–1780), Italian violin-maker
Phil Gagliano (born 1941), former Major League Baseball infielder
Ralph Gagliano (born 1946), Major League Baseball player
S. Thomas Gagliano (1931–2019), American politician
Tommy Gagliano (1884–1951), Sicilian-American mobster
Rico Gagliano, American journalist and podcaster

Italian-language surnames